Faith Divides Us – Death Unites Us is the twelfth studio album by British gothic metal band Paradise Lost, released through Century Media in September 2009. The album cover is based upon the Danse Macabre – "The Abbot" woodcut, first published in 1538.

Track listing

Charts

Personnel

Paradise Lost
Nick Holmes – vocals, lyrics
Gregor Mackintosh – lead guitar; keyboards, music composition
Aaron Aedy – rhythm guitar
Steve Edmondson – bass
Peter Damin – session drums

Orchestral
Florian Magnus Maier – arrangements 
Lucie Svehlova – concertmaster  
Miriam Nemcova – conductor
City of Prague Philharmonic Orchestra – orchestration on the "Prague Mixes" 
Ronny Milanowicz – orchestration (8)

Production
Jens Bogren – audio mixing 
HL (Heino Leja) – vinyl cut mastering 
Jan Holzner – recording engineering
Johan Ornborg – engineer

Album design
Chiaki Nozu – photography 
Stefan Wibbeke – layout, artwork
Takehiko Maeda (前田岳彦 (Maeda Takehiko)) – liner notes

Management
Andy Farrow – management
Vicky Langham – assistant management
Peter Button – legal management
Colin Young – accountancy
Paul Bolton – agent
James Fitzpatrick – contractor

Other credits
Published by Element Music Publishing
Mixed, Mastered and Produced at Fascination Street Studios 
Additional Mastering at Optimal Media Production – B979423 & B979424
Pressed by Arvato Digital Services – 53798176

References

2009 albums
Century Media Records albums
Paradise Lost (band) albums
Albums produced by Jens Bogren